Dineshchandra Sircar (1907–1985), also known as D. C. Sircar or  D. C. Sarkar, was an epigraphist, historian, numismatist and folklorist, known particularly in India and Bangladesh for his work deciphering inscriptions. He was the Chief Epigraphist of the Archaeological Survey of India (1949–1962), Carmichael Professor of Ancient Indian History and Culture at the University of Calcutta (1962–1972) and the General President of the Indian History Congress. In 1972, Sircar was awarded the Sir William Jones Memorial Plaque.

Early life and education
Sircar was born in a village of Bangladesh in 1907.

Selected bibliography

He authored more than forty books both in Bengali and English. Some of his best known books include:

 পাল-পূর্ব যুগের বংশানুচরিত  [Pala-purva Yuger Vamsanucarita, Genealogy of Pre-Pala Age] (in Bengali)
 পাল-সেন যুগের বংশানুচরিত  [Pala-Sena Yuger Vamsanucarita, Genealogy of Pala-Sena Age] (in Bengali) 
 অশোকের বাণী  [Asoker Vani, Sermons of Asoka] (in Bengali)
 শিলালেখ-তাম্রশাসনাদির প্রসঙ্গ  [Silalekha-Tamrasasanadir Prasanga, On Stone and Copperplate Inscriptions] (in Bengali)
 প্রাচীন ইতিহাসের কাহিনী  [Pracin Itihaser Kahini, Story of Ancient History] (in Bengali)
 সাংস্কৃতিক ইতিহাসের প্রসঙ্গ  [Sanskritik Itihaser Prasanga, On Cultural History] (in Bengali) (two volumes)   
 Select Inscriptions Bearing on Indian History and Civilisation (two volumes)
 Indian Epigraphy (1965)
 Indian Epigraphical Glossary
 Inscriptions of Asoka,
 Epigraphical Discoveries in East Pakistan
  Studies in the Geography of Ancient and Medieval India
 Some Epigraphical Records of the Mediaeval Period from Eastern India
 Studies in Indian Coins
 Journal of Ancient Indian History Ed.

He edited Epigraphia Indica volumes XXVIII to XXXVI,  three of them jointly and the others independently.

References

Further reading

External links
 
 Prominent epigraphists, Archaeological Survey of India

1907 births
1984 deaths
20th-century Indian historians
Academic staff of the University of Calcutta
Scholars from West Bengal
Bengali historians
Bengali writers
Bengali Hindus
20th-century Bengalis
Indian epigraphers
Indian historians
West Bengal academics